| top point scorer    =  Carlo Canna (29)
| top try scorer      =  Andrew Conway (3)
| Player of the tournament =
| website             = Official website
| previous year       = 2014
| previous tournament = 2014 IRB Tbilisi Cup
| next year           = TBD
| next tournament     = 
}}
The 2015 World Rugby Tbilisi Cup was the third edition of this international rugby union tournament, created by World Rugby. It was played from 13 to 21 June 2015 at the Avchala Stadium in Tbilisi, running alongside the 2015 World Rugby Nations Cup in Romania. The hosts  were joined by 2015 Rugby World Cup counterparts , and development sides Emerging Ireland and Emerging Italy.

Emerging Ireland won the tournament with three from three victories, taking the Tbilisi Cup for their first ever time.

Standings

Fixtures
The fixtures were announced on 6 May 2015.

Matchday 1

Matchday 2

Matchday 3

See also
 2015 World Rugby Nations Cup
 2015 World Rugby Pacific Nations Cup

References

External links

World Rugby Tbilisi Cup
2015 in Georgian sport
2015 rugby union tournaments for national teams
2014–15 in Irish rugby union
2014–15 in Italian rugby union
2015 in Uruguayan sport